Pensər (also, Peisar and Penser) is a village and municipality in the Astara Rayon of Azerbaijan.  It has a population of 4,702.

References 

Populated places in Astara District